Hillcrest High School is a school in Evergreen, Conecuh County, Alabama, United States.

Its address is 1989 Jaguar Road.

Hillcrest combined four county high schools in 1989. Repton High School, Lyeffion High School, Conecuh County High School(Castleberry), and Evergreen High School.

The principal is Dr. William Hines.

Hillcrest also offers a multitude of extracurriculars. Hillcrest has an award-winning marching band. Hillcrest participates in 3A athletics under the AHSAA.

Hillcrest athletics has won two team state championships.

Basketball 2006 4A State Championship
Football 2017 3A State Championship

Matt Likely owns the state sprinting records in 3A and 4A for track and field.

TUSCALOOSA, AL - Hillcrest-Evergreen blanked Randolph County in the second half to capture a 26-16 come-from-behind victory in the AHSAA 2017 Super 7 Class 3A state championship game Thursday at the University of Alabama's Bryant-Denny Stadium.

The state title was the first in Hillcrest football history.

Randolph County (13-2), coached by Pat Prestridge,  marched 67 yards on 11 plays to take the lead in the first quarter when Aaron Knight scored on a 5-yard run.  Jordan Heard booted the extra point and the Tigers led 7-0. Hillcrest (14-1) scored six plays later on a 7-yard pass from junior quarterback Ryan Nettles to Kobe Bradley. A try for two points failed and the Jaguars trailed 7-6. The Tigers tacked on a 49-yard TD pass from Brody Wortham to Tre' Terrell in the second quarter and Hillcrest responded with a 66-yard TD connection from Nettles to Brandon Rudolph, but the Jags still trailed at the half 14-13.

Nettles, who completed 15-of-24 passes for 266 yards and two touchdowns, directed two more scoring drives in the second half with running back Andray  Pope scoring on a 2-yard run and a dazzling 71-yard run, and the Hillcrest defense did the rest.

Smith's Jaguars finished with 16 first downs, 154 yards rushing and 226 passing for 380 yards. Randolph County had 100 yards rushing and 187 passing for 287 yards. Pope finished with a game-high 108 yards rushing on 12 carries and Tyson Nicholson added 43 on 11 carries for Hillcrest. Nettles connected with Joshua Jackson five times for 49 yards and Bradley had four catches for 59 yards. Rudolph also finished with three receptions for 91 yards.

Cam Riley plays at Auburn University.
Jacobee Bryant is a 1st team Big 12 selection playing Cornerback.

SOURCE: Alabama High School Athletic Association

External links

https://www.wsfa.com/story/37021428/hillcrest-evergreen-wins-class-3a-state-championship/

References

alabamarunners.com

https://www.wsfa.com/story/37021428/hillcrest-evergreen-wins-class-3a-state-championship/

Schools in Conecuh County
Public high schools in Alabama